Bornova Aziz Kocaoğlu Stadium is a stadium in the Bornova district of Izmir, Turkey. It was opened to public in 2016 with a capacity of 9,138 spectators. It currently serves as the home venue for football club Karşıyaka.

History
Doğanlar Stadium was inaugurated on 1 October 2016, with a match between Göztepe S.K. and Elazığspor. After the official opening on 8 October 2016, the name was changed from "Doğanlar Stadı" to "Bornova Aziz Kocaoğlu Stadı".

References

Football venues in Turkey
Sports venues completed in 2016
2016 establishments in Turkey